Rodrigo Ernesto Rojas Vade (born 10 October 1983) is a Chilean political activist who was elected as a member of the Chilean Constitutional Convention. He became an icon of the 2019 Chilean protests.

Rojas is nicknamed Pelao Vade (bald Vade) and was one of founding members of The List of the People, a far-left political grouping which won 17% of seats in the Convention. He is openly gay.

During his campaign in 2021, Rojas lied about having cancer. The news, broken by Chilean newspaper La Tercera in September 2021, led to his resignation as Adjunct Vice President of the Constitutional Convention.

Biography

Early life
Born in Puente Alto, Rojas's father worked in Movistar, a Chilean telephone company, and his mother was a homemaker. He studied Theater at the Universidad Mayor, but dropped out due to his family's financial situation. Later he would become a technician in aeronautical prevention, being hired in 2009 by airliner LAN (now LATAM), where he served as a cabin crew member.

Constitutional Convention
In May 2021, Rojas was elected as constituent for District 13, representing working class communes of southern Santiago.

Rojas's alleged cancer condition was met with empathy across the political spectrum, like fellow constituent Carol Bown of the right-wing UDI party, with whom he participated in dialogues organized by broadcaster Chilevisión.

In his September 2021 confession, Rojas said that several years before the election he had been diagnosed with a condition that carried a "great stigma" —which he has yet to reveal—, telling his family and friends that he had cancer. The scandal was covered by many international news outlets. Similarly, he was denounced by the Convention's board led by Elisa Loncón and Jaime Bassa, president and vice-president of that organ.

On 8 September 2021, it was reported that Vade was expelled from «Pueblo Constituyente», political force heir of the original List of the People.

On 20 September he resigned to the Convention, although the Constitution doesn't allow resignations, unless for medical reasons certified by the Constitutional Court.

References

External links
 

Living people
1983 births
2019–2020 Chilean protests
Chilean activists
People from Santiago
21st-century Chilean politicians
Members of the List of the People
Members of the Chilean Constitutional Convention
Political scandals in Chile
Chilean LGBT politicians
Chilean gay men